Kucheh (also Romanized as Kūcheh; also known as Kūchā Bālā, Kūcheh Bālā, and Kūcheh-ye Bālā) is a village in Damen Rural District, in the Central District of Iranshahr County, Sistan and Baluchestan Province, Iran. At the 2006 census, its population was 153, in 30 families.

References 

Populated places in Iranshahr County